disambiguation: for the 1992 anime see The Girl in the Wind

Girl in the Wind is the fourth album by Quarterflash, released on Epic Records in late 1991. Quarterflash, led by the husband-wife team of Rindy and Marv Ross, recruited new members for this release: Sandin Wilson on bass/vocals, Greg Williams on drums, Doug Fraser on guitars, and Mel Kubik on keyboards and saxophone. The new members gave the AOR band an edgier sound. Due to record-label changes, the album was only released in Europe.

The album includes acoustic rock songs "Something More", "Where I Stand", and "Diamond In The Rough", and the love ballads "Is It Any Wonder" and "Let Somebody Love You". The band went on to record an unreleased album in 1995 with the same lineup.

Marv and Rindy Ross released an album in 2002 called Bliss that has several songs from Girl in the Wind as well as four songs from the unreleased album.

Track listing
 "Something More"  (Ross)  - 5:17
 "Where I Stand"  (Ross, Ross)  - 4:05
 "Girl in the Wind"  (Ross, Ross)  - 5:04
 "Is It Any Wonder"  (Ross)  - 4:24
 "Diamond in the Rough"  (Midnight, Ross)  - 3:59
 "One Less Lie"  (Ross, Ross)  - 4:18
 "Love as a Last Resort"  (Ross)  - 4:45
 "Without You"  (Duane Jarvis, Ross, Ross)  - 4:24
 "Paint It Blue"  (Diane Warren)  - 4:05
 "Let Somebody Love You"  (Ross, Ross)  - 4:57

Personnel
Rindy Ross - vocals, saxophone
Marv Ross - guitars
Doug Fraser - guitars
Mel Kubik - keyboards
Sandin Wilson - bass
Greg Williams - drums, percussion

Quarterflash albums
1991 albums
Epic Records albums